Festival Antigonish Summer Theatre runs every year from July through September, in the town of Antigonish, Nova Scotia.  Founded in 1987, FAST presents a summer-long repertory season with a range of productions which appeal to all age groups. Performances are held in the Bauer Theatre building on the St. Francis Xavier University campus.

References

External links
Festival Antigonish - official site

Theatre festivals in Nova Scotia
Summer festivals
Tourist attractions in Antigonish County, Nova Scotia
Antigonish, Nova Scotia